Rosemound is a hamlet in Saskatchewan.

Cut Knife No. 439, Saskatchewan
Unincorporated communities in Saskatchewan
Division No. 13, Saskatchewan